Goma International Airport  is an airport serving Goma, a city in the Democratic Republic of the Congo in Africa.

History

Initially built with a paved 3000 m runway and a large terminal and apron, the airport has not recovered from the 2002 eruption of the volcano Nyiragongo, 14 km to the north. The airport couldn't handle any wide-bodied aircraft except for freight operations run by relief agencies and the United Nations. A stream of fluid lava 200 m by 1000 m wide flowed onto the runway and through the city center as far as the lake shore, covering over the northern 1000 m of the runway and isolating the terminal and apron which were only connected by taxiway to the northern end. The lava can easily be seen in satellite photographs, and aircraft can be seen using the 2000 m southern section of the runway which is clear of lava. A temporary apron was made at the side of the operational part of the runway. A Douglas DC-8 was left stranded on the terminal apron, which is now used by commercial passengers and the military.  In December 2012, a contractor began work on cleaning up and fencing in the airport. In February 2017, satellite imagery showed the runway has not yet been repaired where the lava damage occurred.

News reports first indicated that lava from the 2021 Mount Nyiragongo eruption reached the airport. It was later confirmed that the airport was unaffected.

Airlines and destinations

Military use
Goma International Airport is used by both the Air Force of the Democratic Republic of the Congo and MONUSCO peacekeeping forces.

Accidents and incidents
 On 15 April 2008, 2008 Hewa Bora Airways crash, a Hewa Bora Airways McDonnell Douglas DC-9-51 (registration 9Q-CHN) overshot the runway during an aborted takeoff and crashed into the marketplace immediately to the south of the airport, killing 3 passengers and 37 people on ground.

 On 19 November 2009, Compagnie Africaine d'Aviation Flight 3711, operated by McDonnell Douglas MD-82 (registration 9Q-CAB) bound from Kinshasa overran the runway on landing, suffering substantial damage. The overrun area was contaminated by solidified lava.

 On 4 March 2013, 2013 Compagnie Africaine d'Aviation crash, a Compagnie Africaine d'Aviation Fokker 50 (registration 9Q-CBD) from Lodja crashed short of landing in heavy rain, into a residential area at 17:55 local time. Among the 9 crew and passengers, 6 were killed.

 On 24 November 2019, 2019 Busy Bee crash, a 19-seat airplane from local carrier Busy Bee en route to Beni Airport crashed shortly after takeoff around 9:10 a.m.  At least 27 died, including some on the ground.

See also
Transport in the Democratic Republic of the Congo
List of airports in the Democratic Republic of the Congo

References

External links

Airports in North Kivu
Goma